Purchase Records is a small record label started in 2000 by Joe Ferry, Jim McElwaine, and Karl Kramer, to showcase the talents of the students and faculty at the Purchase College Conservatory of Music. Despite only having released five CDs, the label has already garnered three Grammy nominations for Best Contemporary Folk Album, 2000 (Public Domain); Best Classical Vocal Performance, 2001; and Best Classical Keyboard Performance, 2002. Student work featured in the first release, Public Domain, includes "Mockingbird" by Regina Spektor and "House of the Rising Sun" by Roxy Perry, both of whom have gone on to solo careers.

The Purchase facilities includes a 48-track studio. Releases include albums by Jacque Trussel, chairman of the college's voice department, Doug Munro, head of the jazz studies program, and Bradley Brookshire, director of graduate studies at Purchase. All proceeds from sales are donated to the conservatory's scholarship fund.

Releases
Public Domain (2000) - nominated for a Grammy as Best Contemporary Folk Album
Jacque Trussel, Tenor: Sounds & Sweet Airs: Scenes & Arias for Tenor (2001) - nominated for a Grammy as Best Classical Vocal Performance
Bradley Brookshire, Harpsichord: J.S. Bach, The French Suites (2001) - nominated for a Grammy as Best Classical Keyboard Performance
Doug Munro, Mariano Mangas: Jazz Flamenco Guitars (2001)
Jazz Faculty @ Purchase College - 10th Anniversary Celebration (2002)

See also 
 List of record labels

References

External links

American record labels
Record labels established in 2000
Folk record labels
Classical music record labels